Imperial College Gliding Club is the oldest, and one of the largest, university gliding clubs in the United Kingdom.  Founded in 1930, the club was the second club to become affiliated to the British Gliding Association, and has for most of its life flown from Lasham Airfield in Hampshire. The club maintains an archive website where details of the club's history since 1930 are kept.

See also 

 Frank Irving
 Payne I.C.1

External links
Imperial College Gliding Club
Imperial College Gliding Club archive
Lasham Gliding Society
British Gliding Association
Imperial College London
Imperial College Union
archive website

Clubs and societies of Imperial College London
Gliding in England
Flying clubs